A Deadly Secret is a 1980 Hong Kong film based on Louis Cha's novel of the same title. The film was produced by the Shaw Brothers Studio, directed by Mou Tun-fei and starred Ng Yuen-chun, Liu Lai-ling, Jason Pai, Shih Szu and Yueh Hua.

Cast
 Ng Yuen-chun as Di Yun
 Liu Lai-ling as Qi Fang
 Jason Pai as Ding Dian
 Shih Szu as Ling Shuanghua
 Elliot Ngok as Ling Tuisi
 Cho Tat-wah as Wan Zhenshan
 Wei Hung as Yan Daping
 Tong Kam-tong as Qi Zhangfa
 Tik Wai as Wan Gui
 Ngai Fei as Bu Yuan
 Kwan Fung as Mei Niansheng
 Jim Sam as Baoxiang

See also
Deadly Secret
Lian Cheng Jue

External links

1980 films
Films based on works by Jin Yong
Hong Kong martial arts films
Works based on A Deadly Secret
Wuxia films
Shaw Brothers Studio films
Films directed by Mou Tun-fei
1980s Mandarin-language films
1980s Hong Kong films